Abdirahman Abdallahi Ismail Saylici (born 28 October 1956) is a Somaliland politician who has been Vice President of Somaliland, after winning the election of 2010 together with Ahmed Mohamed Mohamoud Silanyo. He continued as Vice President in the cabinet of Muse Bihi Abdi. Both are members of the Peace, Unity, and Development Party.

References

Living people
1956 births
Peace, Unity, and Development Party politicians
Vice presidents of Somaliland
Somaliland politicians
People from Hargeisa
People from Awdal
Gadabuursi